The 1970–71 season was Aberdeen's 58th season in the top flight of Scottish football and their 60th season of Club. Aberdeen competed in the Scottish League Division One, Scottish League Cup, Scottish Cup, and European Cup Winners' Cup.

Aberdeen finished second in the league behind Celtic and became the first club to be knocked out of European competition in a penalty shoot-out when they lost to Hungarian club Honvéd. Goalkeeper Bobby Clark achieved a record by going 1,155 minutes without conceding a goal in the league, which was surpassed in 2009 by Manchester United goalkeeper Edwin Van der Sar. On 6 February, a fire destroyed part of the Main Stand at Pittodrie. The Scottish Cup trophy was saved by firemen, but many historical club artifacts and items of memorabilia were destroyed.

Squad

Appearances & Goals

|}

Results

Own goals in italics

Scottish League First Division

Final standings

Scottish League Cup

Aberdeen failed to qualify from section 4 of the League Cup.

Group 4

Group 4 final table

Scottish Cup

Aberdeen, the defending champions of the Scottish Cup, were knocked out by Rangers in the quarter final.

Europe

Aberdeen made history by becoming the first club to be knocked out of European competition on penalty kicks.

References

Aberdeen F.C. seasons
Aber